Richardsville may refer to:

Richardsville, Kentucky, an unincorporated community in Warren County
Richardsville, Pennsylvania, an unincorporated community in Jefferson County
Richardsville, Virginia, an  unincorporated community in Culpeper County

See also
Richardville (disambiguation)